Thyrinteina arnobia is a species of geometrid moth in the family Geometridae. It is found in Central America, North America, and South America.

The MONA or Hodges number for Thyrinteina arnobia is 6772.

Subspecies
These five subspecies belong to the species Thyrinteina arnobia:
 Thyrinteina arnobia arnobia (Stoll, 1782)
 Thyrinteina arnobia phala Rindge, 1961
 Thyrinteina arnobia picta Rindge, 1969
 Thyrinteina arnobia quadricostaria Herrich-Schäffer, 1870
 Thyrinteina arnobia tephra Rindge, 1969

References

Further reading

 

Nacophorini
Articles created by Qbugbot
Moths described in 1782